Working on the Statue of Liberty, also known as Statue of Liberty, is a 1946 oil painting by American illustrator Norman Rockwell, showing workmen cleaning the torch held aloft by the Statue of Liberty (Liberty Enlightening the World) in New York Harbor.

Creation
The painting was created for the cover of an edition of The Saturday Evening Post, published on 6 July 1946, from sketches that Rockwell made in March 1946. It depicts the cleaning of the amber-coloured glass of the torch, an operation undertaken annually each July. Five workmen are attached to the statue by ropes, including one who is a caricature of Rockwell himself, and one African-American in a red shirt. The inclusion of a non-white figure working with whites, apparently only noticed in 2011, contravened a Saturday Evening Post policy of only showing people of ethnicity in subservient roles.

Display in the Oval Office
The painting came into the possession of Steven Spielberg, who donated it to the permanent art collection of the White House in 1994. It was displayed in the Oval Office during the administrations of Bill Clinton, George W. Bush, and Barack Obama, sometimes to the left of the President's desk, above a cabinet or table on which was displayed Frederic Remington's sculpture The Bronco Buster. It was later moved by Obama to a position next to the fireplace, above a bust of Martin Luther King Jr. In January 2017, shortly after the inauguration of Donald Trump, the painting was still in the Oval Office. It was reportedly removed later in 2017, in favor of a portrait of Andrew Jackson.

See also
 Art in the White House

References

External links

 Detailed record of the painting via the Norman Rockwell Museum website

1946 paintings
Paintings by Norman Rockwell
Works originally published in The Saturday Evening Post
Art in the White House
Statue of Liberty
Birds in art